Live in the City of Light is the first (double LP / CD) live album by Scottish rock band Simple Minds. It was released in May 1987 to document their successful worldwide Once Upon a Time tour, and charted at No. 1 in the UK. The album spawned one chart single release, a live version of "Promised You a Miracle".

Overview
The album was recorded live mainly on 12 & 13 August 1986 at Le Zénith, Paris, France (Paris is nicknamed "La Ville de Lumière" which means "The City of Light", hence the album title), on the last dates of the Once Upon a Time world tour, with the only track "Someone, Somewhere In Summertime" recorded in late October 1986 at Sydney Entertainment Centre in Sydney, Australia. It features the band's 1986 touring lineup, which included second vocalist Robin Clark and percussionist Sue Hadjopoulos. Additional "fixing and mixing" was done at Castle Sound Studios in Edinburgh and Bearsville Studios in Bearsville, New York. Lisa Germano (at the time, a John Mellencamp band member who would perform on Simple Minds' next studio single, Belfast Child), contributed studio-overdubbed violin on "Someone Somewhere in Summertime" and former Simple Minds member Derek Forbes contributed uncredited bass guitar overdubs.

Album cover
Although the album was not recorded there, the inside of the gatefold sleeve curiously features a photograph taken at another show from the same Once Upon A Time tour: on 9 July 1986 at Piazza Grande, a square in Locarno, Switzerland.

Release details
Live in the City of Light was released as a double vinyl album with the band's logo in gold lettering over black sleeve. The package featured a 12" x 12" attached giant-sized booklet with state-of-the-art photography of the band's performance and outdoor session pictures. This art could not be reproduced faithfully on later CD releases (an original 1st pressing on double-fat jewel case and the USA version packaged in a long box on two separate discs).

Track listing
All tracks recorded live on 12 & 13 August 1986 at Le Zénith, Paris, France except "Someone, Somewhere In Summertime" recorded live on 24 (or 30) October 1986 at the Entertainment Centre, Sydney, Australia.

Side one

Side two

Side three

Side four

Complete setlist of the shows on 12 & 13 August 1986 in Paris, France
Source
 Intro / Waterfront 
 Speed Your Love To Me (missing track on the live album)
 Come A Long Way (missing track on the live album)
 Book Of Brilliant Things 
 Ghost Dancing 
 Don't You (Forget About Me) 
 Big Sleep 
 Promised You A Miracle 
 Hunter And The Hunted (missing track on the live album)
 Once Upon A Time 
 Oh Jungleland 
 All The Things She Said (missing track on the live album)
 Alive And Kicking 
 New Gold Dream (81/82/83/84)
 Someone Somewhere (In Summertime) 
 Sanctify Yourself 
 East At Easter 
 Medley: Love Song / Sun City / Thank You / Dance To The Music

Personnel
Adapted from the album's liner notes.

 Simple Minds
Jim Kerr – vocals
Charlie Burchill – guitars
Michael MacNeil – keyboards, piano
Mel Gaynor – drums, backing vocals
John Giblin – bass

Additional personnel
Robin Clark – additional vocals
Sue Hadjopoulos – percussion
Lisa Germano – studio-overdubbed violin on "Someone Somewhere in Summertime"
Derek Forbes – bass overdubs on "Promised You a Miracle" and "Someone Somewhere in Summertime" (uncredited)

Technical
Bruce Lampcov – producer, mixing
Steve Riddle – engineer
Douglas Cowan – computer work
Callum Malcolm – assistant engineer (Castle Sound Studios)
Tom Cadley – assistant engineer (Bearsville Studios)
Bob Ludwig – mastering
Malcolm Garrett – sleeve
Guido Harari – photography
William F. Ryan – "Claddagh" drawing
Mick Haggerty – original Simple Minds logo

Charts

Certifications

References

1987 live albums
Simple Minds live albums
Virgin Records live albums